Cheiloseae is a tribe of plant of the family Euphorbiaceae. It comprises 2 genera, one of which is Neoscortechinia.

See also
Taxonomy of the Euphorbiaceae

References

Acalyphoideae
Euphorbiaceae tribes